Donald Wilson (born 16 March 1944) is a former Australian racing cyclist. He won the Australian national road race title in 1975 and 1977. He also competed in the individual road race and the team time trial events at the 1968 Summer Olympics.

Wilson won and set the fastest time in the amateur Goulburn to Sydney Classic in 1967 run in reverse direction from Milperra to Goulburn.

References

External links
 

1944 births
Living people
Australian male cyclists
Sportspeople from Geelong
Olympic cyclists of Australia
Cyclists at the 1968 Summer Olympics